God's Gift – 14 Days is a 2014 South Korean television series written by Choi Ran (the writer of Iljimae), starring Lee Bo-young, Cho Seung-woo, Kim Tae-woo, Jung Gyu-woon and Kim Yoo-bin. It aired on SBS from March 3 to April 22, 2014, on Mondays and Tuesdays at 21:55 for 16 episodes.

Plot Summary 
Kim Soo-hyun is a mother whose young daughter Han Saet-byul gets kidnapped and murdered. Discovering a miraculous ability to go back in time exactly two weeks before the event, Soo-hyun is determined to expose the kidnapping plot and save her daughter before she dies all over again. Helping her is Ki Dong-chan, a former cop turned private investigator out to prove the innocence of his mentally challenged brother, who is falsely accused of murdering Dong-chan's ex-girlfriend. As Soo-hyun and Dong-chan race against the clock in the allotted 14 days, new light is shed on the crimes, and they uncover secrets far more treacherous than Soo-hyun could have ever imagined.

Cast

Main characters
Lee Bo-young as Kim Soo-hyun 
A successful TV writer for a current affairs program. She travels back in time to bring her dead child back to life.

Cho Seung-woo as Ki Dong-chan
He was once an outstanding police officer, who left the force after a certain incident. Now a private investigator, Dong-chan has a personal connection to the case and helps Soo-hyun when she goes back in time.

Kim Tae-woo as Han Ji-hoon
He is a human rights lawyer who is passionate about his work and is a loving husband to Soo-hyun and devoted father to Saet-byul. But he is also harboring a secret.

Jung Gyu-woon as Hyun Woo-jin
A detective in the violent crimes division, he graduated the police academy at the top of his class and is already known as future police commissioner material. He is Soo-hyun's first love, and she suddenly comes to him out of nowhere and begs him to find the suspect who will kill her daughter in two weeks' time. Initially disbelieving, he gets sucked into the case and puts his career on the line to help her.

Kim Yoo-bin as Han Saet-byul
Soo-hyun and Ji-hoon's daughter. Saet-byul is quirky and cute, though a bit of an outsider at school. She doesn't get good grades, but is warm and kind despite the fact that the other kids leave her out and call her the weird kid. Her one friend is Young-gyu.

Baro as Ki Young-gyu 
A developmentally disabled teenage boy with the mental age of a six-year-old. He is Saet-byul's friend, and tries to save her from the kidnapper.

Han Sun-hwa as Jenny 
She started out as a con artist who'd already been to jail five times, until Dong-chan hired her as a fraud detection expert.

Supporting characters
Park Hye-sook as Jang Mi-soon
Soo-hyun's mother.

Kim Jin-hee as Joo Min-ah
Soo-hyun's junior colleague who had an affair with Ji-hoon. She became pregnant with his child, but miscarried when she fell down the stairs while Ji-hoon was forcing her to go to an abortion clinic.

Jung Hye-sun as Lee Soon-nyeo
Mother of Dong-chan and Dong-ho. She takes care of her grandson Young-gyu.

Jung Eun-pyo as Ki Dong-ho
Dong-chan's older brother, and Young-gyu's father. Falsely accused and imprisoned for the murder of Dong-chan's girlfriend, Soo-jung.

Shin Goo as Choo Byeong-woo
A businessman disguised as a homeless bum.

Ahn Se-ha as Na Ho-gook
Dong-chan's junior colleague when he was in the police force.

Yeon Jae-wook as Wang Byeong-tae
Expert hacker who works at Dong-chan's private investigator office.

Kang Shin-il as Kim Nam-joon
The President of South Korea.

Joo Jin-mo as Lee Myeong-han
Presidential chief of staff.

Ye Soo-jung as Park Ji-young
The First Lady.

No Min-woo as Theo  
After witnessing his beloved older brother's suicide, he went into a long period of depression. He decides to fulfill his brother's lifelong dream of becoming a musician in his place, and successfully becomes the front man of the rock band Snake. He is Saet-byul's favorite idol singer. However, unforeseen events threaten to quash his dreams altogether when the shoe of a missing child is discovered in his van. Although he isn't prosecuted as a criminal, he is still considered as a possible suspect in the case.

Oh Tae-kyung as Jang Moon-soo or Chang Moon-soo
Owner of stationery shop.

Im Ji-kyu as Ryu Jin-woo
Park Min-jung as Mimi
Jang In-sub as Manager	
Kim Min-chan as Soo-hyun's junior colleague (ep 1)
Lee Yeon-kyung as owner of Destiny Cafe (ep 1)
Kim Il-joong as MC (ep 1–2)
Lee Seung-hyung as TV director/PD (ep 1–2)
Joo Ho as Kim Joon-seo (ep 2)
The President's son.

Kang Sung-jin as Cha Bong-sub (ep 3–6)
Serial killer who murdered three women, including Young-gyu's mother and Dong-ho's friend Mimi.

Kwak Jung-wook as Han Ki-tae (ep 5–6)
Kang Byul as Ki-tae's girlfriend (ep 6)
Choi Min-chul
Oh Tae-kyung
Lee Si-won as Lee Soo-jung
Dong-chan's girlfriend who was murdered.

Original soundtrack

Ratings
In the table below, the blue numbers represent the lowest ratings and the red numbers represent the highest ratings.

Awards and nominations

International broadcast
It aired in Thailand on PPTV beginning October 7, 2014, dubbed as Sibsee Wan Sawan Kamnod . ("14 วัน สวรรค์กำหนด").

Remake

On December 16, 2016, ABC announced a 10 episode straight-to-series order for an American remake of the series which is titled Somewhere Between, and was shot in Vancouver, Canada, in March 2017, and started airing in June 2017. It was written by Stephen Tolkin (Legend of the Seeker, Brothers & Sisters). Paula Patton, Devon Sawa and JR Bourne star as the main characters. The show was cancelled after one season.

References

External links
God's Gift: 14 Days Official SBS website 

2014 South Korean television series debuts
2014 South Korean television series endings
Seoul Broadcasting System television dramas
Korean-language television shows
South Korean time travel television series
South Korean fantasy television series
South Korean thriller television series
Television series by KeyEast